Subhi Abdul Hamid (‎; January 31, 1924 in Baghdad – January 14, 2010 ) was Iraqi  Foreign Minister  from 1963 to 1964. He was a Free Officer with a strong proclivity toward Cairo. He also served as interior minister during the mid-1960s. He went into exile and survived an assassination attempt at Cairo in 1972.

References

1924 births
2010 deaths
Iraqi diplomats
Foreign ministers of Iraq
People from Baghdad